The Big Beat is an American music and dance television program broadcast on the ABC Network in 1957. It was hosted by Alan Freed, and subsequently by Richard Hayes. The program debuted on May 4, 1957, four months before American Bandstand, making it the United States' "first nationally-televised rock 'n roll dance show". The fourth episode caused an uproar 1957 when it showed Frankie Lymon, a black teen star, dancing with a white woman.

Two more episodes were aired but the show was suddenly cancelled. A local version continued on WNEW-TV New York.

The Wall Street Journal summarized the end of the program as follows. "Four episodes into “The Big Beat,” Freed’s prime-time TV music series on ABC, the show was canceled after black singer Frankie Lymon was seen on TV dancing with a white audience member".

References

1957 American television series endings
American Broadcasting Company original programming
Black-and-white American television shows
Pop music television series